The 20103 / 20104 Gorakhpur–Lokmanya Tilak Terminus Sant Kabir Dham Superfast Express is a Superfast Express train belonging to Indian Railways that runs between  and Lokmanya Tilak Terminus, Kurla (Mumbai) via Basti in India.

Coaches

20103 / 20104 Gorakhpur Junction–Lokmanya Tilak Terminus Sant Kabir Dham Superfast Express presently has 1 AC 2 tier, 4 AC 3 tier, 10 Sleeper class, 4 General Unreserved coaches & 1 Pantry car. As with most train services in India, coach composition may be amended at the discretion of Indian Railways depending on demand.

Service

20104 Gorakhpur Junction – Lokmanya Tilak Terminus Sant Kabir Dham Superfast Express covers the distance of 1680 kilometres in 30 hours 5 mins (55.23 km/hr) & 1680 kilometres in 30 hours 5 mins as 20103 Lokmanya Tilak Terminus - Gorakhpur Junction Sant Kabir Dham Superfast Express (56.10 km/hr). As the average speed of the train is more than 56 km/hr, its fare includes a Superfast surcharge.

It goes via Aishbagh Badshahnagar route without reversing its direction at Lucknow Jn.

Route & halts

 
 
 

 
 
 Lucknow Aishbagh

Traction

It is hauled by a Ajni-based WAP-7 or Kalyan-based WAP-7 locomotive in both directions.

Gallery

References 

Transport in Mumbai
Passenger trains originating from Gorakhpur
Express trains in India
Rail transport in Madhya Pradesh
Rail transport in Maharashtra
Railway services introduced in 2010